Burton "Bud" David Rose (November 19, 1942 – April 24, 2020) was an American nephrologist and the creator of UpToDate, an online medical resource.

Career 
Burton Rose was a clinical professor of medicine at Harvard University. He also held positions at the University of Massachusetts Medical School, Brigham and Women's Hospital, and Beth Israel Deaconess Medical Center. He was the author of Clinical Physiology of Acid-Base and Electrolyte Disorders and Pathophysiology of Renal Disease; and the co-author of Renal Pathophysiology: The Essentials.

Rose created the first version of UpToDate, in his house in 1992. It was released on floppy disks. In October 2017, more than 1.3 million clinicians in 187 countries have consulted UpToDate's website and mobile apps, with viewings of more than 32 million topics per month.

In 2019, the American Society of Nephrology announced the "Burton D. Rose, MD, Endowed Lectureship".

Death 
Rose, who had Alzheimer's disease, died from complications from COVID-19 on April 24, 2020, during the COVID-19 pandemic in Massachusetts.

References 

1942 births
2020 deaths
American nephrologists
Harvard Medical School faculty
20th-century American physicians
21st-century American physicians
Deaths from the COVID-19 pandemic in Massachusetts